Santiago Fernando González Larraín (born 15 May 1956) is a Chilean engineer who served as minister during the first government of Michelle Bachelet (2006–2010).

Since 2015, he is rector of the Central University of Chile.

References

1953 births
Living people
University of Santiago, Chile alumni
Technical University of Munich alumni
21st-century Chilean politicians
Radical Social Democratic Party of Chile politicians
Ministers of Agriculture of Chile
People from Santiago
Heads of universities in Chile